Varlık is a monthly Turkish literature and art magazine. Established by Yaşar Nabi Nayır, Sabri Esat Siyavuşgil, and Nahit Sırrı Örik in 1933, it often publishes poetry and works of famous Turkish poets and writers.

History and profile
Varlık was first published as a biweekly magazine in Ankara on 15 July 1933. The owner of the magazine Sabri Esat Siyavuşgil during the initial years. He was also cofounder of the magazine. The other founders include Yaşar Nabi Nayır and Nahit Sırrı Örik. In 1946 the magazine moved to Istanbul. The same year the publisher of the magazine, Varlık Publications, was founded. Following the death of Yaşar Nabi Nayır in 1981 his daughter, Filiz Nayır, began to edit the magazine. From 1983 to 1990 the magazine was edited by Kemal Özer, a Turkish author and poet.

Varlık has a unique significance  in Turkish literature. Most Turks who have become famous in literature have become so through publishing their works in Varlık, such as Sait Faik Abasıyanık. Significant contributors include Cahit Sıtkı Tarancı, Orhan Veli Kanık, Nurullah Ataç, Ziya Osman Saba, Oktay Akbal, Mahmut Makal, Necati Cumalı, Fazıl Hüsnü Dağlarca, Behçet Necatigil, Cahit Külebi, Orhan Kemal, Haldun Taner and Tahsin Yücel. The magazine also introduced the work by Dostoevsky, Turgenev, Gogol, Kafka, Tolstoy, Steinbeck, Hemingway, Balzac, Malraux, Zola, Gide, Camus and Sartre through Turkish translations. Since 2001 the magazine has been a member of the Eurozine network.

See also
List of literary magazines

References

External links
 Varlık Online

1933 establishments in Turkey
Biweekly magazines published in Turkey
Cultural magazines published in Turkey
Literary magazines published in Turkey
Literary translation magazines
Magazines established in 1933
Magazines published in Istanbul
Magazines published in Ankara
Monthly magazines published in Turkey
Poetry literary magazines
Turkish-language magazines
Turkish poetry